Krasnoslobodsk is a town in Sredneakhtubinsky District of Volgograd Oblast, Russia, located on the east bank of the Volga River across from Volgograd, the administrative center of the oblast. Population: 

Krasnoslobodsk has the geographical peculiarity of being located on (at the western end of) one of the largest inland river islands in the world.

History
It was founded as the khutor of Bukatin. After 1917, it was renamed Krasnaya Sloboda. In 1955, it was given its present name and granted town status. Krasnaya Sloboda was a Suburb of Stalingrad. In 1942 German forces reached the Volga opposite the town, but were defeated in 1943.

Administrative and municipal status
Within the framework of administrative divisions, it is, together with three rural localities, incorporated within Sredneakhtubinsky District as the town of district significance of Krasnoslobodsk. As a municipal division, the territory of Krasnoslobodsk and two of the rural localities are incorporated within Sredneakhtubinsky Municipal District as Krasnoslobodsk Urban Settlement. The remaining rural locality (the khutor of Sakharny) is incorporated as a part of Frunzenskoye Rural Settlement in Sredneakhtubinsky Municipal District.

References

Notes

Sources

Cities and towns in Volgograd Oblast